Semi-active guidance can refer to:
Semi-active radar homing
Semi-active laser guidance